Puławy may refer to the following places:
Puławy in Lublin Voivodeship (east Poland)
Puławy, Subcarpathian Voivodeship (south-east Poland)
Puławy, West Pomeranian Voivodeship (north-west Poland)